Amy Wyllys Bartlett (March 18, 1949 – February 29, 2004) was an American poet and poetry editor.

Life
She grew up in Concord, Massachusetts. She graduated from Vassar College in 1972, and from New York University with a master's degree in 1985.

She served on the Board of Directors of Poets House and as poetry editor of Tin House Magazine.

Her work appeared in Tin House

Her papers are held at Vassar College.

Awards
 1984 National Poetry Series, for Afterwords

Works

References

1949 births
2004 deaths
American women poets
Vassar College alumni
20th-century American poets
20th-century American women writers
21st-century American women